Associação Desportiva Futsal Tubaronense, known as Tubarão, is a Brazilian futsal club from Tubarão. It has won one Campeonato Catarinense. The club is a partnership with Unisul Esporte Clube, which owns the Liga Futsal franchise spot.

Club honours

State competitions
 Campeonato Catarinense de Futsal: 2018

Current squad

References

External links
 Tubarão official Facebook page
 Tubarão LNF profile
 Tubarão in zerozero.pt

Futsal clubs established in 2004
2004 establishments in Brazil
Futsal clubs in Brazil